The 1983 Ladies European Tour was the fifth season of golf tournaments organised on behalf of the Women's Professional Golfers' Association (WPGA), which later became the Ladies European Tour (LET). There were 17 tournaments on the schedule.

There was a major organisational change from the end of the 1982 season, which ended with the future of the tour in doubt after several tournaments were cancelled. Following action in the High Court, the departure of executive director Barry Edwards, who was also responsible for the tour's marketing, was secured, and administration of the tour was taken over by the Professional Golfers' Association (PGA). The new executive director of the WPGA was Colin Snape, who had previously been a director at the PGA.

There were twelve new tournaments on the calendar, and only half of the ten from the previous season survived. The Women's British Open, which was to have been jointly sanctioned by the LPGA Tour and by far the richest event on the schedule, was cancelled when sponsors Hitachi withdrew due to the failure of organisers, the Ladies Golf Union, to secure television coverage.

The Order of Merit was won for the second time by Muriel Thomson.

Tournaments
The table below shows the 1983 schedule. The numbers in brackets after the winners' names show the number of career wins they had on the Ladies European Tour up to and including that event. This is only shown for members of the tour.

Order of Merit
The Order of Merit was based on a points system.

See also
1983 LPGA Tour

References

External links
Official site of the Ladies European Tour

Ladies European Tour
Ladies European Tour
Ladies European Tour